Colin Fleming and Ken Skupski were the defending champions but decided not to participate together.
Skupski played alongside Carsten Ball. However, they lost to Daniel Cox and James Ward in the quarterfinals.
Fleming partnered up with Ross Hutchins. They won the title, defeating Dustin Brown and Martin Emmrich 4–6, 7–6(8), [13–11] in the final.

Seeds

Draw

Draw

References

 Doubles Draw

Aegon Trophy - Doubles
2011 Men's Doubles

id:AEGON Trophy 2011 – Tunggal Putra